Tevita Manako, also known as David Manako (born 11 November 1971) is a Tongan former rugby union player who played as centre and wing.

Career
Manako started playing rugby for Northland in the National Provincial Championship, playing there between 1993 and 1995. This included appearing at wing for North Auckland against the 1993 British and Irish Lions, the first game of the Lions' 1993 New Zealand tour.  His debut for Tonga was on 11 February 1995, against Japan, in Nagoya. He was also part of the Tonga 1995 Rugby World Cup squad, but he never played any match at the tournament. Manako's last cap for Tonga was on 3 June 2000, against Japan, in Tokyo. 
He also played for New Zealand Divisional Team in 1993 and was an All Black trialist in the same year, playing for the Possibles.

References

External links
David Manako at New Zealand Rugby History

1971 births
Living people
Tongan rugby union players
Rugby union centres
Tongan expatriates in New Zealand
Northland rugby union players
Tonga international rugby union players